Pabst is a German surname. Notable people with the surname include:

Adolf Pabst (1899–1990), American mineralogist and geologist
Daniel Pabst (1826–1910), American furniture maker
Frederick Pabst (1836–1904), American brewer
Georg Wilhelm Pabst (1885–1967), Austrian film director
Guido Frederico João Pabst (1914-1980), Brazilian botanist
Hermann Pabst (1842–1870), German historian
Johann Heinrich Pabst (1785–1838), German-Austrian physician, philosopher and lay theologian
Pavel Pabst (1854–1897), Prussian pianist and composer
Thomas Pabst (born 1966), founder of Tom's Hardware, a computer hardware publication
Waldemar Pabst (1880–1970), German soldier and right-wing political activist

See also
Pabst Brewing Company, brewing company once owned by Frederick Pabst
Pabst Blue Ribbon, a beer brand
Pabst Brewery Complex, a facility in Milwaukee, Wisconsin, that was closed in 1997
Pabst Mansion, the Milwaukee home to Captain Frederick Pabst
Pabst Theater, a theatrical venue in Milwaukee, Wisconsin named after the Pabst family
Pabst Hotel, a short-lived New York City hotel sponsored by the brewing company
Pabst Plan, a Nazi plan to reconstruct Warsaw after its near-total destruction in 1944
Papst (disambiguation)

German-language surnames
Occupational surnames